The Nahar surname means "stream or river" in Arabic and Consequently in Persian, Urdu, Hindi & Bangla (it also means 'fountain' in Bangla). 

Nahar may refer to:

Places
 Nahar, East Azerbaijan, a village in East Azerbaijan Province, Iran
 Nahar, Mazandaran, a village in Mazandaran Province, Iran
 Nahar Block of Rewari, a region in India, including a village called Nahar
 Nahar, Semnan, a village in Semnan Province, Iran
 Al Nahar, alternative name for the Palestinian village al-Nahr, depopulated in 1948
Nahar al-Aaz (Glory River), Iraq

Media
 Al-Nahar, an Egyptian television channel
 An-Nahar, Lebanese newspaper
 Annahar (Kuwait), Kuwaiti newspaper
 Ennahar (Algeria), Algerian newspaper
 Ennahar TV, an Algerian 24-hour television news channel

Fiction 
 Lord Nahar, a character in The Echorium Sequence fantasy trilogy by Katherine Roberts

Others
 Judge Nahar, an epithet for Yam (god), Levantine god of the sea and rivers
 Nahar, local name for the Ceylon ironwood Mesua ferrea
 Chechen nahar or naxar, a currency that Chechen separatists planned for the Chechen Republic of Ichkeria

Persons
 Albamarina Nahar, The Film Director
 Dilshad Nahar Kona, The Bangladeshi Singer
 Kamrun Nahar, The Bangladeshi Scientist
 Lutfun Nahar Lata, The Bangladeshi Actress
 Moatasem Al Nahar, The Actor
 Rukku Nahar, The British Actress
 Sultana N Nahar, The American Physicist
 Sandeep Nahar, The Actor

See also
 Aram-Naharaim, region mentioned in the Bible
 Nahara (disambiguation)
 Nahor (disambiguation)